Alisa Kelli Wise (born December 14, 1962) is an Associate Justice of the Alabama Supreme Court.

Education 

Wise is a graduate of Auburn University and the Thomas Goode Jones School of Law at Faulkner University in Montgomery, Alabama. She later earned a Master of Public Administration from Auburn University at Montgomery.

Judicial career 

She previously served on the Alabama Court of Criminal Appeals, to which she was first elected in 2000.  Upon taking office in 2001, she became the youngest woman to ever serve on an Alabama appellate court. Re-elected in 2006, she resigned from the appellate court upon her election to the Alabama Supreme Court. She was first elected as a Republican in 2010 to the Alabama Supreme Court, and re-elected in 2016.

Personal life 

She and her husband, retired District Judge Arthur Ray, have one daughter.

References

External links

 Biography at Vote Smart

1962 births
Living people
20th-century American lawyers
21st-century American judges
Alabama Republicans
American United Methodists
Auburn University alumni
Federalist Society members
People from Geneva County, Alabama
Justices of the Supreme Court of Alabama
Thomas Goode Jones School of Law alumni
21st-century American women judges
20th-century American women